The 1974–75 Nationalliga A season was the 37th season of the Nationalliga A, the top level of ice hockey in Switzerland. Eight teams participated in the league, and SC Bern won the championship.

Standings

External links 
 Championnat de Suisse 1974/75

Swiss
National League (ice hockey) seasons
1974–75 in Swiss ice hockey